A list of films produced in Hong Kong in 1974:.

1974

References

External links
 IMDB list of Hong Kong films
 Hong Kong films of 1974 at HKcinemamagic.com

1974
Lists of 1974 films by country or language
Films